The Ebola River ( or ), also commonly known by its indigenous name Legbala, is the headstream of the Mongala River, a tributary of the Congo River, in northern Democratic Republic of the Congo.

The name Ebola is a French corruption of Legbala, its name in Ngbandi which means 'white water'. During the Belgian administration these names were interchangeable along with the French names Eau Blanche and rarely L'Ébola.

In 1976, Ebola virus was first identified in Yambuku,  from the Ebola River, but the virologist Karl Johnson decided to name it after the river so that the town would not be associated with the disease's stigma. Thus, the river is eponymous to the terms Ebola virus, Ebolavirus, and Ebola virus disease (usually referred to as simply "Ebola").

References

External links

Ebola
Rivers of the Democratic Republic of the Congo